Peter J. Solomon (born September 17, 1938) is an American investment banker and the founder and chairman of Solomon Partners, one of the country's first independent investment banks. He is also a former New York City Deputy Mayor for Economic Policy and Development.

Early life and education
Peter J. Solomon was born in Manhattan, New York on September 17, 1938 to Sidney L. Solomon, the chairman of department store chain Abraham & Straus, and Jeannette (Rabinowitz) Solomon. He attended the Collegiate School on New York's Upper West Side and graduated from Lawrenceville School, a private boarding school in Lawrenceville, NJ.

Solomon graduated cum laude from Harvard College in 1960, where he majored in government, and received a Masters of Business Administration from Harvard Business School in 1963.

Career
Solomon began his career in the statistics department of Merrill Lynch in 1958. He joined Lehman Brothers as an associate in the corporate finance department after graduating from business school in 1963. He became a managing director in 1971 and a member of the firm's board of directors in 1976.

He also served as an adjunct professor at Columbia Business School.

Government activity 
In 1978, Solomon was appointed Deputy Mayor for Economic Policy and Development by New York City mayor Edward I. Koch, a position he held until 1980. He was Koch’s principal advisor on taxes, ports, energy and private sector employment and commerce.

As Deputy Mayor, Solomon led negotiations to host the 1980 Democratic National Convention. He also encouraged the development of movie and television studios in New York City.

As chairman of the Industrial & Commercial Incentive Board (ICIB), Solomon instituted reform to the real estate tax abatement system, restructuring the system to curb abuses and loopholes, while stimulating private real estate investment. He also served as chairman of New York’s Health and Hospital Corporation, managing 17 municipal hospitals.

In 1980, Solomon was appointed Counselor to the United States Treasury Secretary under President Jimmy Carter, where he oversaw the President's auto task force and industrial policy.

In 1981, Solomon returned to Lehman Brothers. He remained at Lehman and its successor, Shearson Lehman, until the end of the decade, becoming vice chairman of the firm, co-chair of the investment banking division and chairman of the merchant banking division.

Peter J. Solomon Company 
Solomon left Lehman in 1989 to found the Peter J. Solomon Company, a boutique financial advisory firm that was one of the first independent investment banks in the country. The company advises public and private companies on mergers & acquisitions, capital structure and restructuring.

The Peter J. Solomon company's clients include Lands' End in its sale to Sears; Zagat, in its sale to Google and Office Depot and Phillips-Van Heusen Corp. (PVH) via multiple acquisitions. While the firm was known for its focus on consumer and media clients, it has expanded into a number of other sectors including energy, infrastructure, power, renewables, media, grocery and restaurants, among others.

In 2016, Natixis, the international investment banking arm of French financial institution Groupe BPCE, acquired a 51% majority stake in the Company, which subsequently rebranded as PJ SOLOMON in 2019 and Solomon Partners in 2021.

Cuomo Administration 
In 2013, Solomon was appointed as the co-chairman of Governor Cuomo’s Tax Reform and Fairness Commission, charged with proposing reforms to the state’s tax code. He also served on the Governor’s Spending and Government Efficiency Commission, responsible for streamlining New York’s agencies and bureaucracy.

Other activities 
Solomon is currently a director of Monro, Inc., an automotive service company, of which he was previously the chairman from 1984 to 2007. He is a member of the Natixis International Advisory Network and the US Trust Bank of America Private Bank Advisory Committee. Previously, he served on a number of company boards, including:

 Associated Dry Goods Corporation
 BKF Capital Group, Inc.
 Centennial Cellular Corporation
 Century Communications Corp.
Culbro Corporation
 Edison Brothers Stores, Inc.
 Esquire, Inc.
 Handyman Corporation
 Lawfin International Limited 
 LIN Broadcasting Corporation
 The Miller-Wohl Company
 Office Depot, Inc.
 Phillips-Van Heusen Corporation
 The Stop & Shop Companies, Inc.
 Zagat Survey LLC

Personal life 
Solomon is married to the former Susan Rebell. They have five children and twelve grandchildren.

He is an experienced beekeeper and donated a large gift to build an insectarium bearing his name at the American Museum of Natural History.

Charitable contributions 
Solomon’s personal foundation was established in 1987. He is a board member of the Memorial Sloan-Kettering Cancer Center, Memorial Hospital for Cancer and Allied Diseases and Sloan-Kettering Institute for Cancer Research. He is also a member of the Board of Overseers of Memorial Sloan-Kettering Cancer Center. 
Solomon is a trustee of the American Museum of Natural History, Co-Chair Emeritus with his wife of the American Friends of the Musée d’Orsay, Chairman Emeritus and director of The Manhattan Theatre Club and a trustee of the Lucius N. Littauer Foundation.

At Harvard University, Solomon donated his collection of important children’s literature and illustrations to Houghton Library. He and his wife were the primary financial contributors to the renovation of Houghton. In his honor, Harvard built a new Gate to Harvard Yard, naming it the Peter J. Solomon, Class of 1960, Gate. Solomon is Chairman of the Friends of the Center for Jewish Studies at Harvard. He is also a member of the Council on Foreign Relations. Previously, he was an overseer of Harvard University.

Solomon previously served on a number of not-for-profit boards, including:

 Chairman, Hudson Guild Neighborhood House
 Vice Chair, Mt. Sinai Hospital
 Director-at-Large, Montana Land Reliance
 Director, American Rivers
 Director, National Audubon Society

References

1938 births
Living people
American investment bankers
Harvard University alumni
American company founders
Harvard Business School alumni